Culmstock Halt railway station served the village of Culmstock, historically in Devonshire, England, from 1876 to 1963 on the Culm Valley Light Railway.

History 
The station was opened on 29 May 1876 by the Culm Valley Light Railway. It was situated on the east side of the B3391. Opposite the platform was the goods yard which had two sidings; one serving a loading dock and the other serving a goods shed. 'Halt' was added to the station's name on 2 May 1960 as it became an unstaffed halt. It closed on 9 September 1963. The sidings were lifted in 1965.

References 

Disused railway stations in Devon
Railway stations in Great Britain opened in 1876
Railway stations in Great Britain closed in 1963
1876 establishments in England
1963 disestablishments in England